13th Street is a side platformed Sacramento RT Light Rail station in Downtown Sacramento, California, United States. The station was opened on March 12, 1987, and is operated by the Sacramento Regional Transit District.  It is served by all three RT light rail lines:  Gold, Blue and Green, with the latter serving as the southern terminus. The station is located at 13th Street between Q and R Streets, and Regional Transit's Customer Service and Sales center is located just to the south of the station. A small rail yard named the "R Street Yard" is located to the west of the station. 13th Street station was the temporary terminal from March 12, 1987 to September 5, 1987 when it was extended to Butterfield.

Platforms and tracks

References

Sacramento Regional Transit light rail stations
Railway stations in the United States opened in 1987